Catherine of Thouars was the daughter of Constance, suo jure Duchess of Brittany and Countess of Richmond, and her third husband Guy of Thouars. She was the first wife of Andrew III, Baron of Vitré.

Family 
Catherine was the second daughter of Constance, Duchess of Brittany, and Guy of Thouars. Her mother died soon after she was born. Catherine had a twin sister, Margaret, and their mother might have died because of a difficult delivery After her mother's death, her father married Eustachie of Chemillé, and had two sons, Peter and Thomas.

Catherine was the younger half-sister of Eleanor, Matilda and Arthur, Constance and Geoffrey of England's children, the sister of Alix and Margaret, and the elder half-sister of Peter and Thomas of Chemillé, Guy and Eustachie of Chemillé's sons.

Union and issue 
In 1212, Catherine married Andrew III, Baron of Vitré, whose father Andrew II had been Constance's ally. They had three children:
 , who married Guy VII, Lord of Laval;
 Eustachie, who married Geoffrey I Botherel, Lord of Quintin;
 Alix, who married Fulk of Mathefelon (c. 1200 † c. 1269), Lord of Azay.

Portrayals in literature 
Catherine of Thouars is a secondary character in the novel Le Poids d’une couronne (légende bretonne) (1867-1868) by Gabrielle d’Étampes and is mentioned in the novel Dans l’Ombre du Passé (2020) by Léa Chaillou, where it is revealed that the heroine’s sister is named after her.

References

See also 
 Constance, Duchess of Brittany
 Guy of Thouars

1201 births
Barony of Vitré
Vitré, Ille-et-Vilaine
13th-century French people 
13th-century French women
Year of death unknown